Tecticrater cervae is a species of very small deepwater limpet, a marine gastropod mollusc in the family Lepetellidae.

References

 Powell A. W. B., New Zealand Mollusca, William Collins Publishers Ltd, Auckland, New Zealand 1979 

Lepetellidae
Gastropods of New Zealand
Gastropods described in 1948